A Little Princess, The Musical is a musical with music by Andrew Lippa and book and lyrics by Brian Crawley, based on the 1905 children's novel of the same name by Frances Hodgson Burnett.

Production history 
Produced by TheatreWorks, the musical premiered at the Mountain View Center for the Performing Arts in Mountain View, California, on August 28, 2004, following previews from August 25. This production was directed by Susan Schulman with a cast that starred MacKenzie Mauzy as Sara Crewe and Will Chase as Captain Crewe. Although A Little Princess was labeled as "Broadway-bound", the musical has not, as of July 2016, been produced on Broadway.

In September 2005, A Little Princess was featured in National Alliance for Musical Theatre's 17th Annual Festival of New Musicals, held off-Broadway at Dodger Stages in New York City.

A cast recording featuring Sierra Boggess as Sara, Julia Murney as Miss Minchin, Will Chase as Captain Crewe, and Remy Zaken was released in 2010 by Ghostlight Records.

A new version of the musical was performed in a concert in October 2011 by the Texas State University musical theatre department, conducted by Lippa.

On May 28, 2018, the musical received its premiere in London at Southbank Centre. The one-night-only production was the first to have a child ensemble playing its array of schoolgirls. Amanda Abbington played Miss Minchin, and Danny Mac played Captain Crewe.
 
The performing rights to the musical are available from Musical Theatre International.

Plot summary 
Note: Summary taken from Music Theatre International's website

Act one
Sara Crewe is in trouble from the outset. She has been sent to her room without supper for coming to the table barefoot. Becky, a young maid about the same age, smuggles a muffin upstairs to Sara, and peppers her with questions about what life was like in Africa.

Everyone else at the London school has been stand-offish, so Sara is glad to answer the questions, and invites Becky to picture the send-off she received from her friends in Fort St. Louis in ("Good Luck, Bonne Chance"). After the townspeople wish her the best, Sara's father, Captain Crewe, bids her a private farewell. He reveals he must send her to London as he is embarking upon a mission of exploration to the forbidden city of Timbuktu. He promises, once the Saharan trek is over, he will return to London to fetch her home ("Soon, My Love"). Sara and Becky's reverie is over when Miss Winifred Minchin surprises the two girls. Servants and schoolgirls are not meant to mix; Minchin asks Becky to fetch her cane. Sara protests that her father's instructions were that she was not to be corporally punished. Miss Minchin replies she is aware of the instructions and will beat Becky in Sara's stead. Between the bare feet and illicit camaraderie, Minchin is convinced Sara has no idea how to behave in a civilized fashion. She, therefore, forbids Sara to speak to anyone without permission. Once the monstrous headmistress leaves, Sara vents her frustration ("Live Out Loud").

The next day the other schoolgirls corner Becky and demand to know everything she learned about Sara. The girls are envious of Sara's wealth, and her privileges - she's out riding a pony while the rest take their exercise in a courtyard - but curious as well. Lavinia, the oldest and meanest of the girls, threatens to harm Becky just as Sara returns from her ride. Lavinia backs down when she sees Sara's riding crop. She continues, though, to tease Becky, joking about the accident that left Becky an orphan.

To comfort Becky, Sara confides her own mother is deceased. She offers to help Becky get in touch with her mother's spirit. Miss Amelia, Miss Minchin's sister, can't resist this idea. Sara begins to tell the girls how to contact spirits. Her tales are so vivid they seem to come to life. Soon the schoolgirls are joined by imagined Indians in a joyous dance; a spirit enjoins Becky to let her heart be her compass ("Let Your Heart Be Your Compass"). It is Sara's first success with the other schoolgirls. But it is short-lived. During the dance Lavinia leaves to fetch Miss Minchin, who arrives furious. As part of Sara's punishment, Minchin tears a letter from Captain Crewe into pieces. She also sends Becky to the workhouse. Whilst this is happening, a schoolgirl named Ermengarde picks up the prices of Sara's letter.

In Africa, Captain Crewe is met with one setback after another. His retinue dies off; his trade goods are stolen; he is detained by a tribal leader with deep suspicions as to an Englishman's reasons for being there. Feverish, despairing, Crewe imagines how happy his daughter must be in London ("Isn't That Always the Way").

Sara's defense of Becky has won her two new confidantes: Ermengarde, who has pieced together Crewe's letter for Sara, and Lottie, the youngest of the schoolgirls, who is intrigued by the doll Sara brought by her father, it was made in France and a gift upon his departure from her. Ermengarde reads the letter to Sara and they all imagine what her father is doing over in Africa (The Widow Zuma). Sara enlists Ermengarde and Lottie's help to create such chaos at school that Becky is recalled from the workhouse, and restored to her position. Miss Minchin, realizing she has been outmaneuvered, believes all Sara's advantages come to her because she has been born lucky ("Lucky").

Meanwhile, in Sara's room, Ermengarde and Lottie apologize to Becky for their past transgressions against her and promise to be her friends in future, just as Sara is. Becky is cowed at first. Sara assures her that wealth and position are mere 'accidents of birth'; Becky is willing to agree that even if it were the other way around, she and Sara would have wound up friends ("The Tables Were Turned"). Time passes and Sara's birthday arrives. Miss Minchin is a bit more disposed to be kind to the girl; rumors have reached London that Captain Crewe made it to Timbuktu. Minchin has made a small fortune on the resultant stock market speculation. Sara's classmates are fascinated by a large box from the London docks. It turns out to be full of presents Sara has ordered for the other girls.

There is no time to enjoy them. A barrister brings news that not only did Crewe never make it to Timbuktu, he died in disgrace. At a stroke, Sara is left a penniless orphan, and Miss Minchin's own fortune disappears. She decides, rather than put Sara out on the street, to make her a serving girl, sell all her things, and house her in a dark attic room. Sara does not believe what she has been told, and is determined to find out the truth ("Soldier On").

Act two
Lottie visits Sara in her new room just before the Christmas holiday. She is shocked by the drab, cold attic. Sara comforts her by describing it as a new, exciting place full of unexpected magic ("Another World"), though once Lottie leaves the depressing reality of it returns.

Downstairs the schoolgirls are dressed in their best, ready for a holiday. It is almost Christmas ("Almost Christmas"), and all they can think of are the presents awaiting them at home. Sara is sent out on a cold Christmas Eve to buy a goose for Miss Minchin. She hurries past the happy last-minute shoppers, wondering where her father might be. She imagines she hears Pasko, a friend from St. Louis.

That she does find a goose, and at the last minute, is quite impressive to Miss Amelia. She suggests sharing the holiday meal with Sara, who angers Miss Minchin. Miss Amelia resolves to leave the school and find a way to have Sara released; she tells the child how she and her sister once played at being virtuous little princesses too ("Once Upon A Time"). Miss Amelia leaves. Miss Minchin sends Sara to her room, but mourns her hollow victory over the girl ("Lucky Reprise"). She locks Sara and Becky in the attic for the night.

Sara is disconsolate. Becky tries to use Sara's doll to invoke the magic of the imagination, to comfort Sara the way she has been comforted herself; nothing happens. Sara goes to sleep while Becky mourns the powerlessness of the broken doll ("Broken Old Doll").

The two girls sleep. Pasko sneaks in through the window, bringing food, fire-wood, and blankets to the girls. While he does so Sara and Becky dream of fantasy Indians bearing more exotic objects and luxuries, and of Captain Crewe becoming a hero by reaching his destination ("Timbuktu"). Becky and Sara awake from the dream smelling the breakfast Pasko has left them. They are startled to see him, and Becky cries out. Miss Minchin, hearing Becky's startled cry, comes up to check on the girls to make sure if they're okay. Pasko brought a plank of wood so the girls and him can escape via the rooftops. Becky, afraid of heights, stays behind, but promises to meet them later.
The girls have heard of Sara's escape and gossip downstairs ("Gossip").

Miss Minchin seizes Becky and determines to have she Sara arrested. Sara arrives with the highest authority in the land, Queen Victoria, whom she has waylaid and regaled with stories of the cruel headmistress. It is Minchin who is arrested. Victoria acknowledges, just before Sara returns to Africa, that anyone can be a princess if their hearts are open and their actions true. Sara and her father are reunited. ("Finale").

Song list
Note: from the Studio cast album, released in 2011

Act 1
Overture
Good Luck – Bonne Chance - Sara and Chorus
Soon, My Love – Captain Crewe
Live Out Loud – Sara 
Let Your Heart Be Your Compass – Sara, Becky, School Girls, and Chorus
 The Widow Zuma – Ermengarde, Sara, Lottie
Home by Christmas – Captain Crewe
Isn't That Always the Way – Captain Crewe
Lucky – Miss Minchin
If the Tables Were Turned – Becky, Sara, Ermengarde, Lottie
Timbuktu Delirium – Chorus
Soldier On – Sara
Be a Princess – Sara, Lavinia, Ermengarde, Lottie and other school girls

Act 2
Another World – Sara
Almost Christmas – Sara, Schoolgirls and Chorus
Captain Crewe – Pasko
Once Upon A Time – Miss Amelia
Broken Old Doll – Becky
Timbuktu – Becky, Sara, and Chorus
Soon – Pasko, Sara, Becky, and Miss Minchin 
Gossip – Ermengarde, Lottie, Lavinia, Becky, and other schoolgirls 
"Compass" Reprise – Chorus, School Girls
Finale – Full Company

Critical response 
Richard Connema, for Talkin' Broadway, wrote:
"I give credit to TheatreWorks, Mr. Lippa, Mr. Crawley and director Susan H. Schulman for working toward making this old-fashioned family musical work wend its way to Broadway. However, the show needs to flow more smoothly and the characters need to be defined more sharply. There is just too much going on, with too little focus on the central characters. It's not a sophisticated musical, but there are saving graces in this production's singing, exuberant athletic dancing, melodic score and good production values. However, something is lacking to make it a great musical. Two liabilities are the indigestible book and two stories presented side by side".

References 

2004 musicals
Musicals based on novels
Operas set in India